Iardinis is a genus of spiders in the family Symphytognathidae. It was first described in 1899 by Simon. , it contains 2 species.

References

Symphytognathidae
Araneomorphae genera
Spiders of Asia